Beauharnais could refer to:
 Beauharnais, a French noble family
 Beauharnais v. Illinois, a U.S. Supreme Court precedent
 Hôtel Beauharnais, a historic building in Paris, France